Sunday is a 1915 American silent drama film directed by George W. Lederer and starring Reine Davies, Montagu Love and Barney McPhee.

Cast
 Reine Davies as Sunday
 Montagu Love as Henry Brinthorpe
 Barney McPhee as Arthur Brinthorpe
 Charles Trowbridge as Jacky
 William H. Tooker as Towzer
 Al Hart as Davy 
 Adolf Link as Lively
 Jeanette Bageard as Lizette
 Charles Dickson as Tom Oxley

References

Bibliography
 Goble, Alan. The Complete Index to Literary Sources in Film. Walter de Gruyter, 1999.

External links
 

1915 films
1915 drama films
1910s English-language films
American silent feature films
American drama films
American black-and-white films
Films directed by George W. Lederer
World Film Company films
1910s American films
Silent American drama films